Mörður Árnason (born 30 October 1953) is an Icelandic politician. He was born in October 30, 1953, and belongs to the Social Democratic Alliance. He was a member of the Althing for the Reykjavik Constituency South from 2003 to 2007, and for the Reykjavik Constituency North from 2010 to 2013.

See also
Alþingi

References

External links
Mörður Árnason home page (icelandic)

Mordur Arnason
Living people
1953 births